Kendall A. Smith is an American scientist most well-known for his work on interleukins, the regulatory molecules of the immune system, which has led to many of the new present-day  therapies for immunological disorders, transplant rejection, infectious diseases and cancer. Smith is a Professor Emeritus of Medicine at  Weill Cornell Medicine.

Early life 
Kendall Arthur Smith was born in Akron, Ohio, where he grew up as the second child of Robert Lyman Smith and Juanita Murphy Smith. He attended Fairlawn Primary School, Simon Perkins Junior High School followed by Buchtel High School in Akron, graduating in 1960.

Medical and scientific training 
Smith graduated from Denison University, Granville, Ohio with a B.S. in biology (1964). He graduated summa cum laude from the Ohio State University College of Medicine in 1968, then trained in Internal Medicine at Yale-New Haven Hospital (1968-1970). Smith then trained at the National Cancer Institute, Dartmouth Medical School and L’Institut de Cancerologie et d’Immunogenetique in Villejuif, France (1970-’74).

Career 
Smith joined the faculty of Dartmouth Medical School (Hanover, N.H.) as an Assistant Professor of Medicine in Hematology & Oncology in 1974, progressing to Associate Professor (1978) and Professor (1982).

In 1993 Smith moved to Weill Cornell Medicine in New York City to conduct clinical research in AIDS. There he served as the Chief of The Division of Immunology as well as the Co-Chair of the Immunology Program of The Graduate School of Biomedical Sciences, a joint program between Cornell and Sloan-Kettering Institute.  He also served as the Director of The Tr-Institutional MD/PhD Program, a joint effort between Cornell, Sloan-Kettering and the Rockefeller University.

Publications 

 Molecular Immunity: A Chronology of 60 Years of Discovery,  World Scientific Publishing Company, 2018
 The Interleukin 2 Receptor, Academic Press, New York, 1988
 The Quantal Theory of Immunity: The molecular Basis of Autoimmunity and Leukemia. World Scientific Publishing Co. Pte. Singapore, 2008
Molecular Immunity: A Chronology of 60 Years of Discovery, ISBN 9789813231702, World Scientific Publishing Co. Pte., 2018

Honors and awards 

 1965   Nu Sigma Nu Award for the Outstanding First year Medical Student
 1966   The Chauncy Leake Award
 1967   Alpha Omega Alpha honor society
 1968   Landacre Society – Student Research Honorary Society, President
 1968   Robert Nelson Watman Award for Outstanding Achievement in Research and Medicine
 1968   M.D. summa cum laude
 1979   Elected as Fellow to the American College of Physicians
 1981   Elected to the American Society for Clinical Investigation
 1989   Friedrich-Sasse Foundation Award
 1993   Denison University Alumni Citation Award
 2009  Alumni Achievement Award, The Ohio State University College of Medicine

Journals 

 The generation of the first antigen-specific functional monoclonal T cells, Nature, 268:154-156, 1977.
 The creation of the T cell Growth Factor (IL2) bioassay, 1978
 The Scientific Rationale For The Interleukin Nomenclature, . J. Exp. Med. l5l:l55l-l556, 1980
 The biochemical characterization of the IL-2 molecule, Mol. Immunol. 18:1087-1094, 1981
 The demonstration that memory T cells are differentiated cytokine producers, Med., 173:25-36, 1991.
 The development of a new nontoxic dosing regimen for IL-2 immunotherapy, Proc. Natl. Acad. Sci.  U.S.A.  93:10,405-10,410, 1996.
 Therapeutic Use Of IL2 To Enhance Antiviral T Cell Responses In Vivo. Nature Med. 9:1-8, 2003

References

1940s births
Year of birth uncertain
Living people
Weill Medical College of Cornell University faculty